The Hippocratic Crush, also known by its Chinese language title On Call 36 Hours (Chinese: On Call 36小時) is a 2012 Hong Kong television medical drama series produced by Poon Ka-tak and TVB. The drama follows the lives of young housemen, residents, and their mentors working in Mercy Hospital (慈愛醫院), a fictional hospital set in Hong Kong.

A sequel series with 30 episodes, The Hippocratic Crush II (a.k.a. On Call 36 Hours II), began filming in February 2013. The sequel premiered on 4 November 2013.

Plot
The drama revolves around a group of housemen joining in as doctors in training in Mercy Hospital and their trainers. Throughout the drama, many events unfurl challenging the housemen and their mentors: romance, tragedy, family events and past memories and much more happen throughout the drama.

Cheung Yat Kin (Kenneth Ma) recently graduated and started his practice in neurosurgery at Mercy Hospital (慈愛醫院). Kin is a determined doctor who took his work seriously and strictly followed the rules. Although his medical interns were afraid of his strict rules and high expectations, they respected his exceptional skills and experiences. Kin initially studied medicine because he was grateful to the doctor Fan Chi Ngok (Yu's father) who saved his younger brother Cheung Yat Hong's (Nathan Ngai) life after a horrible traffic accident. Kin took great care of his brother and worked hard to earn enough money to send his brother for him to study overseas. Worried that his brother will be unable to take care of himself as his legs are paralyzed, Kin decided that his mother shall accompany his brother overseas. Thus Kin had to work doubly hard to earn enough money to support both of them. Kin's incredible work ethic enabled him to work hard and save enough money to support his brother financially. For that reason, Kin did not consider being committed into a relationship until he met Fan Chi Yu (Tavia Yeung). Yu, a reputable doctor, worked on several projects with Kin and found herself falling in love with him. However, when she found out that her long lost sister, Hung Mei Suet (Mandy Wong), also liked Kin, she decided to give up on pursuing him. Subsequently, Kin realized that he also had feelings for Yu when she stopped talking to him and confessed his love to her. Shortly after Kin and Yu started their relationship, Hong got into an accident and tragically died. Kin's grief over his younger brother's tragic death greatly influenced his attitude towards his interns, especially Yeung Pui Chung (Him Law), who Kin had always considered him as a younger brother. To make matters worse, Kin suddenly finds out that Yu suffers from tumor in her spine which may become life-threatening. Yu actively searched for treatment and her persistent spirit motivated Kin to get back on his feet to support her. Unfortunately, Yu's condition worsened, and she took the risk of undergoing a risky surgery. As a doctor and Yu's boyfriend, Kin and Yu's father took on the challenge to do the surgery on her. After enduring the hardships together, Kin and Yu's feelings grew deeper and got happily married.

Episode plots

Diseases and medical procedures presented 
There were much fewer medical procedures in The Hippocratic Crush 2 (On Call 36 Hours II).

evaluation of a pedestrian hit by a car, possible broken arm (episode 1, patient To Tze Lam)
obtaining a blood specimen (episode 1, episode 1)
observation of small traumatic intracranial bleed of a pedestrian hit by a car (episode 1, patient To Tze Lam)
traumatic epidural hemorrhage requiring surgery (episode 1, patient To Tze Lam)
placement of heparin lock (episode 2, episode 2)
frontal lobe brain tumor causing personality change (episode 3)
traumatic hydrocephalus from Thai boxing causing increased in brain pressure (episode 3)
unsuccessful CPR (episode 3)
penetrating head trauma of a metal pole to the head (episode 3)
bleeding aneurysm during removal of a frontal lobe brain tumor that was causing personality change (episode 3)
successful blood drawing by Onion (episode 4)
stitching a skin wound (episode 4)
teaching of physical exam of the lungs including tapping (percussion) and use of stethoscope (episode 4)
evaluation of a drowning victim with bleeding from the head (episode 4)
evaluation of a pedestrian hit by a car and having bleeding in the brain (episode 4)
surgery of bleeding in the brain from being hit by a car (episode 4)
evaluation of traumatic injuries in a drunk driver and subsequent unsuccessful CPR (episode 4)
successful blood drawing by Onion (episode 5)
teaching of how to feel an abdominal aortic aneurysm (episode 5)
traumatic pericardial tamponade and pericardial tap (episode 5)
seeing a nicotine patch and certifying death and EKG (episode 5)
practical exam: brain cancer 2 years after lung cancer (episode 6)
practical exam: stitching a skin wound (episode 6)
practical exam: detecting an abdominal aortic aneurysm by physical exam (episode 6)
bandaging of wrist, hand, and knee wounds (episode 6)
personality changes (seeing ghosts) from a frontal lobe brain tumor and surgery to remove tumor, bleeding from aneurysm in the operating theatre and insubordination in clipping aneurysm without supervision of a consultant (episode 6)
clinic visit of patients with brain blister, follow-up of stroke in Uncle Fook (episode 7)
hematuria and flank pain diagnosed as kidney stone and treated with ESWL (episode 7)
different appearance of epidural hemorrhage and subdural hemorrhage on CT - schematic drawing (episode 8)
hypertensive crisis requiring hospitalization (episode 8)
urethritis in a small boy (episode 8)
stabbed in the heart requiring surgical removal of knife (episode 9)
open heart surgery (episode 9)
brain bleed in a patient with heart injury requiring anti-coagulation (episode 9)
Parkinson's Disease (episode 10)
bipolar disorder (episode 10)
elder abuse and bruising (episode 10)
Cesarean section and repair of aortic rupture (episode 11)
deep brain stimulation for Parkinson's disease (episode 12)
intraoperative brain hemorrhage during placement of deep brain stimulator (episode 12)
pneumothorax from central line placement (episode 14)
myasthenia gravis with ptosis (episode 14)
lumbar puncture (episode 14)
revision of skull removal (episode 15)
thymectomy (episode 15)
tension pneumothorax (episode 15)
gangrene of the hand (episode 15)
tension pneumothorax (episode 16)
post-operative pneumonia (episode 16)
acute occlusion of iliac artery (episode 18)
herniated disc (episode 19)
pericardial effusion (episode 20)
recurrence of glioma (episode 20)
cardiomyopathy (episode 21)
intracranial hemorrhage and contrecoup injury (episode 22)
heart transplantation (episode 22)
hemothorax and craniotomy resulting from fall (episode 23)
discectomy (episode 23)
subtotal resection of thoracic intramedullary astrocytoma (episode 24)

Cast

The Cheung family

The Fan family

The Hung family

Tsz Oi Hospital

Management

Neurosurgery

Cardiothoracic Surgery

Orthopaedics

Internal Medicine

Nurses

Urology

Obstetrics & Gynecology

Cleaner

Awards and nominations
2012 TVB Anniversary Awards
Won: My Favourite Male Character (Kenneth Ma)
Won: Most Improved Female Artiste (Mandy Wong)
Nominated: Best Drama
Nominated: Best Actor (Kenneth Ma)
Nominated: My Favourite Female Character (Tavia Yeung)
Nominated: Best Supporting Actor (Him Law)
Nominated: Most Improved Male Artiste (Him Law)

2012 My AOD Favourite Awards
Won: My Favourite Drama
Won: My Favourite Actor (Kenneth Ma)
Won: My Favourite Actress (Tavia Yeung)
Won: My Favourite Supporting Actor (Him Law)
Won: Top 15 TV Characters (Kenneth Ma, Tavia Young, Him Law)
Won: Favourite On-screen Couple (Kenneth Ma, Tavia Yeung)
Nominated: My Favourite On-screen Couple (Nathan Ngai, Candy Chang)
Nominated: My Favourite Theme Song (Joey Yung)

Viewership ratings

Sequel
A sequel, The Hippocratic Crush II was released on 4 November 2013.

External links
Official website
K-TVB.net

References

TVB dramas
2012 Hong Kong television series debuts
2012 Hong Kong television series endings